The Georgios Papandreou Party was a  political party founded by George Papandreou in 1950.

The party was a continuation of Democratic Socialist Party of Greece. It ran in the 1950 elections and in the 1951 elections. In the 1952 Greek legislative election Papandreou collaborated with Greek Rally.

See also
 Centre Union

Social democratic parties in Greece
Liberal parties in Greece
Defunct political parties in Greece
1950 establishments in Greece
1950s in Greek politics
Centrist parties in Greece
Political parties established in 1950
Georgios Papandreou